District #4 is one of six districts located in Grand Bassa County, Liberia.

Districts of Liberia
Grand Bassa County